Sandy Satullo II (born March 8, 1954) (age 66) is an American stock car racing and sports car racing driver. Now retired, he competed in the NASCAR Winston Cup Series and the ARCA Racing Series, as well as the 24 Hours of Daytona and the Cannonball Run.

Career
Satullo was a native of Fairview Park, Ohio. While he started in 34th place on average, Satullo's average finishes were around 30th place. Sandy competed in 278 laps of top-level stock car racing while leading in none of them. After retiring, his career total earnings were a meager $3,860 ($ when adjusted for inflation).

Sandy favored intermediate tracks (due to his average finish of 19th place) over restrictor plate tracks (where he would finish an average of 35th place). He has raced at Daytona International Speedway, Michigan International Speedway, and Talladega Superspeedway.

Satullo also competed in the ARCA Racing Series, and in 1979 won the ARCA 200 at Talladega.

References

External links
 

1954 births
People from Fairview Park, Ohio
Racing drivers from Ohio
NASCAR drivers
Sportspeople from Cuyahoga County, Ohio
Living people